The Australian Document of Identity (DOI) is a travel document issued by the Department of Foreign Affairs and Trade to Australian citizens and some Commonwealth citizens in specific and rare circumstances.  It is not intended to be a broadly used identity document in Australia, nor does it generally provide evidence of citizenship or residency.

The Australian Certificate of Identity is a related document issued for use by certain persons who do not hold Australian or Commonwealth citizenship.

Purpose
The primary purpose of the Document of Identity is to allow an Australian citizen to travel to Norfolk Island without the need for a passport. By the Australian Passports Determination 2005 a Document of identity is also issued to Australian citizens to whom it is unnecessary or undesirable to issue a passport and, under compassionate circumstance, to non-Australian Commonwealth nationals who are unable obtain a valid travel document from their country or countries of nationality. Examples of this include: Australian citizens who have been denied a passport due to them having an outstanding arrest warrant, Australian citizens who request a document of identity instead of a passport, Australian citizens who are transgender, Australian citizens being repatriated or deported to Australia or extradited, and Australian citizens whose travel the Minister believes should be restricted.

Eligibility
A person in one of the following can apply for a DOI:
 An Australian citizen to whom the issue of an Australian passport is unnecessary or undesirable
 A Commonwealth citizen who cannot obtain a valid travel document for the country or countries of which he/she has nationality for compassionate reasons when he/she needs to travel urgently

Validity
Documents of Identity are issued free to travel to Norfolk Island, but other Documents of Identity are usually only for a single journey, and for a limited period. Many countries do not recognize a Document of Identity as a valid travel document. Furthermore, possession of a currently-valid Australian passport excludes the holder from applying for a Document of Identity.

See also
 Australian Certificate of Identity
Australian passport

References

External links
Department of Foreign Affairs and Trade: Travel Documents
Travel Related Documents

International travel documents
Government of Australia
Identity documents of Australia